Devadurga may refer to:

 The Sanskrit name for Mount of God
 Devadurga, India, a town in Raichur district, Karnataka, India

See also
 Devi Durga, a Hindu goddess